A History of the Pyu Alphabet is a book on the Pyu language first published in 1963 by Tha Myat.

Research 
The author Tha Myat studied Indian and Southeast Asian stone inscriptions before writing the book. It took about ten years for him to understand the Pyu writing and to reveal the denotations of Pyu alphabets.

Publications

First time 
The book was first published in 1963.{{refn|group=nb|It was published 9 years before the publication of The Biography of Myanmar Alphabets.<ref>Publication Record of The Biographies of Myanmar Alphabets and Numbers</ref>}} It was published by National Publishing Works. Tha Myat presented his interpretations of the Pyu portions of the Myazedi Inscription, as well as of other Pyu inscriptions. However, because his translations lacked precision, the Burma historian G.H. Luce called them "tentative".

 Second printing 
The second printing of 500 copies was published in December 2011 by Gangaw Wutyee Publishing House.

 Content 
The book covers the Pyu alphabet and numerals, and includes Romanized transcriptions of sample ancient Pyu stone inscriptions. The book also includes Kamawa (Burmese Buddhist scriptures) and the Mangala Sutta''' in Pyu.

Table of contents 
Combination of vowels with consonants
Various Forms of Alphabets
Conjunct Consonants
Halin Pyu
Sri Ksetra Pyu
Gupta Pyu
Pyu in Roman Characters
Hmawza Payagyigon Pyu manuscripts
The Myazedi inscription Page(A)
The Myazedi inscription Page(B)
Shwesandaw Pagoda, Bagan- Pyu Manuscript
Appendix

Language 
The book's Pyu inscriptions were transcribed in modern Burmese, and at times also in the Latin alphabet. Their meaning was given in both Burmese and English.

Reception 
Historian Than Tun wrote in 1963:

Footnotes

References

External links 

Pyu reader (microform) by U Tha Myat National Library of Australia
Pyu reader: a history of Pyu alphabet-by Lingvist
Pyu Reader: a History of Pyu Alphabet-Documents

Readers
Burmese-language books
Historical linguistics books
Burmese language
Burmese literature
1963 non-fiction books